Retrosheet is a nonprofit organization whose website features box scores of Major League Baseball (MLB) games from 1906 to the present, and play-by-play narratives for almost every contest since the 1930s. It also includes scores from every major league game played since the 1871 season (the inception of organized professional baseball), as well as all All-Star Games and postseason games, including the World Series.

History

Retrosheet informally began in 1989, through the efforts of Dr. David Smith, a biology professor at the University of Delaware, and fellow baseball enthusiasts. Building on momentum begun by writer Bill James' Project Scoresheet in 1984, Smith brought together a host of like-minded individuals to compile an accessible database of statistical information previously unavailable to the general public.

Smith originally contacted teams and sportswriters in order to gain access to their scorebooks, while other contributors researched old newspapers for play-by-play accounts. During the 1988–89 baseball off-season, through a connection with the front office of the Baltimore Orioles, Smith was able to gain access to the Orioles' scorebooks going back to the 1954 season, some 4,700 games. Marshaling the computer expertise of a number of associates, Smith used the accounts from various sources to build a wealth of new data. The result has allowed fans and historians to explore new aspects of baseball history by using pertinent information, as well as to clarify the record with new insights into daily records from each team and each game.

While all teams eventually contributed to the project, gaps occurred with some teams, most notably the Atlanta Braves, Houston Astros and Pittsburgh Pirates of the late 1960s. The Braves, Pirates and Cincinnati Reds have also been lacking information from previous eras. Only through the deduction of game play by plays from various newspapers accounts was Retrosheet able to discern what occurred during some games where no official or team record was found.

The first 40 years of the 20th century have uncovered more play-by-play coverage than the period of the 1940s. The lack of television (and prior to that, radio) accounts serve as the main reasons for this disparity, while World War II limited the space that had been used for such information.

In 1994, the organization began sending out a quarterly newsletter to interested parties, and added a website. Following publication of the January 2002 newsletter, the organization chose to end sending out the paper version, adding periodic updates via their website instead.

By 2007, Retrosheet had been cited as a source in multiple large American newspapers, including The Boston Globe, Chicago Tribune, Detroit Free Press, and Pittsburgh Post-Gazette. In 2012, Retrosheet founder Smith was the recipient of the Henry Chadwick Award from SABR, given annually to a baseball researcher.

As of 2013, Retrosheet had recovered the box scores and entered in the likely play-by-play for over 70% of all the major league games played between 1903 (the start of the modern era of baseball, with the first World Series) and 1984, representing over 115,000 games. In 2013, Retrosheet was able to announce the release of over a century of box scores, spanning from 1914 to 2013. Box score coverage was later extended back to 1906, with additional scores available for 1871, 1872, and 1874. As of November 2020, Retrosheet had play-by-play descriptions for all games played between 1974 and 1983, with a list of "games needed" indexed by season going back to 1920. The most recent game missing a play-by-play description is the Houston at Atlanta game of September 29, 1973, which is the only game missing for the 1973 season.

Retrosheet's board of directors meets each year in conjunction with the annual convention of the Society for American Baseball Research (SABR). Since 2013, they have mostly convened pro-forma via phone to conduct formal business. Many of Retrosheet's contributors are SABR members, whose data is based mostly on the crowd-sourced volunteer-gathered information Retrosheet relies upon for its twice-a-year updates to their site.

Further reading

References

External links

Baseball statistics
1989 establishments in the United States
Baseball websites
Organizations established in 1989
Non-profit organizations based in Delaware